Berg is a locality in Linköping Municipality, Östergötland County, Sweden with 1,278 inhabitants in 2010.

It is home to the Stjärnorp Castle.

References

External links 

Populated places in Östergötland County
Populated places in Linköping Municipality